Chucuyo is a village in the Arica and Parinacota Region, Chile.

See also
 Parinacota, Chile
 Lauca National Park

References

Populated places in Parinacota Province